Linchong is a rural town in Xinhuang Dong Autonomous County, Hunan, China. It borders Zhujiachang Town of Yuping County in the north, Fuluo Town in the southeast, Yushi Town in the northeast, and Liangsan Town in the west and southwest.

History
In 1961, Linchong People's Commune was set up. In 1984 was incorporated as a township. At the end of 2015, Tiantang Township and Huanglei Township were revoked. Some places merged into the township and then it was upgraded to a town.

Administrative division
As of 2015, the town is divided into 24 villages: Linchong, Tangjia, Liujia, Tianba, Dabao, Shimaping, Douxi, Woman, Banlishan, Dipu, Mawang, Tangzhai, Guigen, Dixi, Daoding, Gaodong, Xiaobo, Dabang, Jiepai, Jiaogou, Zhiping, Dawang, Tiantang, and Songzhai.

Geography
The West Stream winds through the town.

Economy
The local economy is primarily based upon agriculture and local industry.

Transportation
The G60 Shanghai–Kunming Expressway passes across the town northeast to southwest.

The Shanghai–Kunming high-speed railway is a high-speed railway passes across the town northeast to southwest.

References

Xinhuang